Alma Kar (14 November 1908 – 1992) was a Polish film actress.

Selected filmography
 The Woman Who Desires Sin (1929)
 Zabawka (1933)
 Panienka z poste restante (1935)

References

External links

1908 births
1992 deaths
Date of death missing
Polish film actresses
20th-century Polish actresses